Clément Gascon (born September 5, 1960) is a Canadian jurist, who was nominated to the Supreme Court of Canada by Prime Minister Stephen Harper on June 3, 2014, and officially appointed the Court on June 9, 2014. He officially retired from the court on September 15, 2019.

Born in 1960 to Dr. Bernard Gascon and Denyse Clément, Gascon graduated from Collège Jean-de-Brébeuf and McGill University.

Gascon was admitted to the Quebec Bar in 1982 and in addition to his legal practice (in business, labour and construction law) was also a lecturer at Cégep de Saint-Jean-sur-Richelieu, Université du Québec à Montreal, McGill University and Bar of Quebec.

Prior to his Supreme Court appointment, Gascon served on the Quebec Superior Court from 2002 to 2012, and the Quebec Court of Appeal from 2012 to 2014. He was previously a lawyer for the Montreal law firm Heenan Blaikie for 21 years.

In June 2018, Gascon wrote for the majority of the court when it found that the Canadian Human Rights Tribunal's determination that the Indian Act did not violate the Canadian Human Rights Act was reasonable. Three concurring justices instead argued that this context was not due judicial deference and instead required review for correctness.

On April 15, 2019, Gascon announced that he would be retiring effective September 15, 2019.

On the evening of May 8, 2019, the Ottawa Police Service issued a notice asking for the public's help in locating Gascon, who had not been seen since early the same afternoon. Shortly afterwards, they announced that he had been located safely. Gascon later announced he had had a panic attack, related in part to his recent decision to retire early from the Court.

See also
 Reasons of the Supreme Court of Canada by Justice Gascon

References

External links

1960 births
French Quebecers
Judges in Quebec
Justices of the Supreme Court of Canada
Living people
McGill University alumni
McGill University Faculty of Law alumni
People from Montreal
21st-century Canadian judges

Academic staff of McGill University
Academic staff of the Université du Québec à Montréal